Reggie  Crawford (born December 4, 2000) is an American baseball first baseman and pitcher for the San Francisco Giants organization. He was drafted in the first round, 30th overall, by the Giants in the 2022 MLB draft.

High school
Crawford grew up in Frackville, Pennsylvania, and attended North Schuylkill High School, where he was a member of the baseball and swimming teams. In swimming, Crawford won the Pennsylvania Interscholastic Athletic Association state championship in the 50-yard freestyle with a record time of 20.45 seconds during his junior year. As a senior, he batted for a .482 average with eight home runs and 39 RBIs and had 4–2 record as a pitcher with 49 strikeouts in 33 innings pitched. Crawford was selected in the 37th round of the 2019 MLB Draft by the Kansas City Royals, but did not sign with the team.

College
Crawford attended the University of Connecticut and batted .365 with a home run and 16 RBIs and had one pitching appearance through 13 games of his true freshman season before it was cut short due to the coronavirus pandemic. After the season, he played collegiate summer baseball for the Westfield Starfires of the Futures Collegiate Baseball League, and was named the league's Co-Top Pro Pitching Prospect at the end of the season after recording three saves and striking out 10 batters in  innings over five appearances. 

As a sophomore, Crawford hit .295 and led the Big East Conference with 13 home runs and 62 RBIs while also posting a 1–1 record with one save and a 2.35 ERA and 17 strikeouts in  innings pitched. He played summer baseball for the Bourne Braves of the Cape Cod Baseball League in 2021. Crawford was also selected to play for the Team USA Collegiate National Baseball Team. Crawford tore the ulnar collateral ligament during a fall scrimmage against Rhode Island and had Tommy John surgery, causing him to miss his junior season. After the conclusion of the 2022 season, he announced that he would be entering the NCAA transfer portal and ultimately committed to transfer to Tennessee.

Professional career 
The San Francisco Giants selected Crawford in the first round, with the 30th overall selection, of the 2022 Major League Baseball draft. He signed with the team on July 28, 2022, and received a $2.3 million signing bonus.

References

External links

UConn Huskies bio

2000 births
Living people
Baseball players from Pennsylvania
Baseball pitchers
Baseball first basemen
UConn Huskies baseball players
People from Schuylkill County, Pennsylvania
Bourne Braves players
Arizona Complex League Giants players